Filinto Strubing Müller (11 July 1900 – 11 July 1973) was a Brazilian politician who served as President of the Senate for the state of Mato Grosso. He was also Chief of Police of the then Federal District during much of the government of Getúlio Vargas. He was killed in the crash of Varig Flight 820 on July 11, 1973, on his 73rd birthday.

Early career

Müller joined the Brazilian Army at age 19, eventually becoming an officer who participated in the Tenente revolts. He was a close collaborator of Vargas since his rise to power in the Brazilian Revolution of 1930, which lead to him being installed as the Chief of Police of the then Federal District. This gave him authority over all civilian police forces in Brazil.

Before and during World War II, he was sympathetic to Nazi Germany, personally encouraging close cooperation between the Gestapo and Brazilian law enforcement. Müller strongly opposed allowing Jewish refugees to enter Brazil prior to WWII and used police resources to monitor the activities of the Jewish Colonisation Association in the country.

Also, he was one of the architects of the Estado Novo, which was characterized by the usage of large-scale torture (it is reported that sometimes he personally participated in torture sessions) and summary executions against political opponents (mostly communists). He was dismissed from his post when Vargas switched sides, moving Brazil to the Allies against Adolf Hitler.

Senator
In 1945 he was one of the founders of the pro-Vargas Social Democracy Party. In 1947 he was elected Senator for the state of Mato Grosso. In 1950 he stood for the post of governor of the same state, but was defeated. He was reelected as senator in 1955 and 1962. In the Senate, he was a supporter of the Kubitschek government. After the military coup of 1964, he joined the pro-regime party ARENA, and soon became its leader. He was reelected Senator in 1970. In 1973 he became President of the Senate.

Personal life
Müller was born in Cuiabá, Brazil in 1900. Müller was married to a Basque woman named Consuelo de la Lastra, and they had two biological daughters: Maria Luiza Müller de Almeida (named after Consuelo's older sister, María Luísa de la Lastra), and Rita Julia Lastra Müller. Together, they adopted de la Lastra's niece, Argentinian-born María Luísa Beatriz del.

Death

Müller died on Varig Flight 820 in France while in office in 1973, on his 73rd birthday. The plane caught on fire, causing it to crash. After his death he was honored as a national hero. Filinto has since been honored publicly by several officials and intellectuals, among them Juscelino Kubitschek and Ulysses Guimarães. On the same flight were his wife, Consuelo, and his grandson, Pedro, who was only sixteen at the time.

References

External links

 Filinto Müller Biography at CPDOC FGV 

1900 births
1973 deaths
People from Cuiabá
Social Democratic Party (Brazil, 1945–65) politicians
National Renewal Alliance politicians
Presidents of the Federal Senate (Brazil)
Members of the Federal Senate (Brazil)
Brazilian anti-communists
Grand Crosses with Star and Sash of the Order of Merit of the Federal Republic of Germany
Victims of aviation accidents or incidents in France
Victims of aviation accidents or incidents in 1973